Mirassol Futebol Clube, commonly referred to as Mirassol, is a Brazilian professional club based in Mirassol, São Paulo founded on 9 November 1925. It competes in the Campeonato Brasileiro Série B, the second tier of Brazilian football, as well as in the Campeonato Paulista, the top flight of the São Paulo state football league.

History 
On November 9, 1925, the club was founded as Mirassol Esporte Clube.

In 1960, another club was founded in the same city, Grêmio Recreação Esporte Cultura Mirassol. Both clubs became rivals until 1963, when they were playing in São Paulo State Championship Third Level.

In 1964, Mirassol Esporte Clube and Grêmio Recreação Esporte Cultura Mirassol (usually nicknamed GREC) fused, and the new club was named Mirassol Atlético Clube.

In 1982, Mirassol Atlético Clube folded, and the club was then renamed to Mirassol Futebol Clube.

In 1997, Mirassol won its first title, the São Paulo State Championship Third Level, beating União Barbarense, Olímpia, and São Caetano in the final four group stage.

In 2007, the club finished in second in its group in the São Paulo State Second Level semifinal stage, thus being promoted for the first time in club's history to São Paulo State Championship Top Level.

Stadium 
The club's home matches are usually played at Municipal José Maria de Campos Maia stadium, which has a maximum capacity of 14,534 people.

Club colors, mascot and nickname 
Mirassol's colors are yellow and green.

The club's mascot is a lion.

Leãozinho, meaning Little Lion, is Mirassol's nickname.

Current squad

Out on loan

Honours
 Campeonato Brasileiro Série C
 Winners (1): 2022

 Campeonato Brasileiro Série D
 Winners (1): 2020

 Campeonato Paulista Série A3
 Winners (1): 1997

References

External links
 Official Site
 Mirassol on Globo Esporte

Mirassol Futebol Clube
Association football clubs established in 1925
Football clubs in São Paulo (state)
Football clubs in Brazil
1925 establishments in Brazil
Campeonato Brasileiro Série D winners